General elections were held in Belgium on 24 November 1991 to elect members of the Chamber of Representatives and Senate. The results represented a big loss for the majority parties (Christian democrats and Socialists) and significant gains for the Vlaams Blok. The day became known as "black Sunday" due to the rise of the far-right party.

These were the last elections before the new 1993 Belgian Constitution, which turned Belgium formally into a federal state: after this election, the number of MPs were reduced while the regional parliaments would become directly elected. The provincial elections would no longer coincide with national elections, but with municipal elections.

By law of 16 July 1991, experiments with electronic voting were carried out for the first time in Belgium during these elections, specifically in the canton of Verlaine (Liège Province) and the canton of Waarschoot (province of East Flanders).

Results

Chamber of Representatives

Senate

Belgium
General
Belgian